Evaristo "Tito" Rubio (February 5, 1902 – March 8, 1938) was an American mobster of Cuban descent and an associate of businessman and crime boss Charlie Wall. Rubio was also a leader in Tampa's Cuban community, prominently involved in illegal numbers racket with Wall.

Early life

Rubio was born on February 5, 1902, in Tampa, Florida.

Turf wars and death

Wall and Rubio had been involved in a violent turf war with Ignacio Antinori. Eddie Virella, Rubio's associate and a co-owner of the Eldorado Club,  was shot down by gunmen on 31 January 1937. Rubio himself was attacked and killed on the back porch of his home on 15th St. in Ybor City, Tampa, Florida, on March 8, 1938.

References

    

1902 births
1938 deaths
Hispanic and Latino American gangsters
Murdered American gangsters